Kampong Lambak is a village in Brunei-Muara District, Brunei, on the outskirts of the country's capital Bandar Seri Begawan.

Administration 
For administrative purposes Kampong Lambak has been divided into, and established as, two village subdivisions:

Both are village subdivisions within Mukim Berakas 'A'.

Facilities 
Datu Mahawangsa Primary School is the village's government primary school. It also shares grounds with Datu Mahawangsa Religious School, the village's government school for the country's Islamic religious primary education.

Kampong Lambak Mosque is the village mosque; it was inaugurated on 11 June 1994 by Prince Sufri Bolkiah, a brother of Sultan Hassanal Bolkiah. The mosque can accommodate 1,400 worshippers.

See also 
 Lambak Kanan
 Kampong Lambak Kiri

Notes

References 

Lambak